The Roman Catholic Diocese of São João del Rei is a suffragan Latin rite diocese in the Ecclesiastical province of the Metropolitan of Juiz de Fora in Minas Gerais state, Brazil.

Its (Marian) cathedral episcopal see is Catedral Basílica Nossa Senhora do Pilar, a Minor Basilica, dedicated to Our Lady of the Pillar, in the city of São João del-Rei.

Geography 
The diocese comprises 25 municipalities.

According to the modern (2017) Brazilian geographic classification by the National Institute of Geography and Statistics (IBGE), the municipalities belong to 5 immediate geographic regions, which themselves belong to 4 intermediate geographic regions.

Intermediate Geographic Region of Barbacena 
Fifteen municipalities at the Intermediate Geographic Region of Barbacena.

Immediate Geographic Region of São João del-Rei 
Thirteen municipalities at the Immediate Geographic Region of São João del-Rei.
 São João del-Rei
 Conceição da Barra de Minas
 Coronel Xavier Chaves
 Lagoa Dourada
 Madre de Deus de Minas
 Nazareno
 Piedade do Rio Grande
 Prados
 Resende Costa
 Ritápolis
 Santa Cruz de Minas
 São Vicente de Minas
 Tiradentes

Note: of the 14 municipalities in the Immediate Geographic Region of São João del-Rei, only São Tiago belongs to an other diocese: the Diocese of Oliveira, in the ecclesiastical province of Belo Horizonte.

Immediate Geographic Region of Barbacena 
Two municipalities at the Immediate Geographic Region of Barbacena.
 Barroso 
 Dores de Campos

Intermediate Geographic Region of Varginha 
Eight municipalities at the Intermediate Geographic Region of Varginha.

Immediate Geographic Region of Lavras 
Eight municipalities at the Immediate Geographic Region of Lavras.
 Lavras
 Carrancas
 Ijaci
 Ingaí
 Luminárias
 Itutinga
 Itumirim 
 Ibituruna

Intermediate Geographic Region of Pouso Alegre 
One municipality at the Intermediate Geographic Region of Pouso Alegre.

Immediate Geographic Region of Caxambu-Baependi 
One municipality at the Immediate Geographic Region of Caxambu-Baependi.
 Minduri

Intermediate Geographic Region of Juiz de Fora 
One municipality at the Intermediate Geographic Region of Juiz de Fora.

Immediate Geographic Region of Juiz de Fora 
One municipality at the Immediate Geographic Region of Juiz de Fora.
 Andrelândia

Diocesan administrative divisions (foranias) 

The 25 municipalities are divided in six smaller administrative regions called foranies. The parishes from the municipality of São João del-Rei belong to two distinct foranies.

 Forania of Our Lady of the Pillar: seven parishes of São João del-Rei. Headquartered in São João del-Rei.

 Forania of Good Jesus of Matosinhos: seven parishes of São João del-Rei and all the parishes from the municipalities of Santa Cruz de Minas, Coronel Xavier Chaves and Ritápolis. Headquartered in São João del-Rei.

 Forania of Conception of Our Lady: all the parishes from the municipalities of Tiradentes, Prados, Resende Costa, Lagoa Dourada, Barroso and Dores de Campos. Headquartered in Prados.

 Forania of Our Lady of Nazareth: all the parishes from the municipalities of Conceição da Barra de Minas, Nazareno, Itutinga, Itumirim and Ibituruna. Headquartered in Nazareno.

 Forania of Our Lady of the Harbor of Eternal Salvation: all the parishes from the municipalities of Piedade do Rio Grande, Madre de Deus de Minas, São Vicente de Minas, Carrancas, Minduri and Andrelândia. Headquartered in Andrelândia.

 Forania of Saint Anne: all the parishes from the municipalities of Lavras, Ijaci, Ingaí and Luminárias. Headquartered in Lavras.

History 

On May 21, 1960, the Diocese of São João del-Rei was established as Dioecesis Sancti Ioannis a Rege (Latin), on territories split off from the Diocese of Campanha, Archdiocese of Mariana, and (then) Diocese of Juiz de Fora.

Statistics 
As per 2015, its pastoral services reached 506,000 Catholics (85.1% of the total population, 594 800), on 9 503 km², and 40 parishes.

Religious persons 

 72 priests: 48 diocesan, 24 religious;
 2 deacons;
 109 lay religious: 57 brothers, 52 sisters;
 9 seminarians.

Episcopal Ordinaries 
All suffragan bishops to this date have been Roman rite native Brazilians.
 Delfim Ribeiro Guedes (1960-07-23 – retired 1983-12-07), died 1985; previously Bishop of Leopoldina (Brazil) (1943-06-26 – 1960-07-23)
 Antônio Carlos Mesquita (1983-12-16 – 1996-06-26), died 2005; previously Titular Bishop of Tamada (1974-04-08 – 1977-03-06) as Coadjutor Bishop of Oliveira (Brazil) (1974-04-08 – 1977-03-06) and Apostolic Administrator sede plena of Oliveira (Brazil) (1974-04-08 – 1977-03-06), succeeding as Bishop of Oliveira (Brazil) (1977-03-06 – 1983-12-16)
 Waldemar Chaves de Araújo (1996-06-26 – retired 2010.05.26), previously Bishop of Teófilo Otoni (Brazil) (1989-11-18 – 1996-06-26)
 Célio de Oliveira Goulart, Order of Friars Minor (O.F.M.) (2010-05-26 – death 2018-01-19), previously Bishop of Leopoldina (Brazil) (1998-06-24 – 2003-07-09), Bishop of Cachoeiro de Itapemirim (Brazil) (2003-07-09 – 2010-05-26)
José Eudes Campos do Nascimento (2018-12-12 - present).

References

Sources and External links 
 GCatholic.org, with Google map - data for all sections
 Catholic Hierarchy
 Diocese website (Portuguese)

Roman Catholic dioceses in Brazil
Roman Catholic Ecclesiastical Province of Juiz de Fora
Religious organizations established in 1960
Roman Catholic dioceses and prelatures established in the 20th century
1960 establishments in Brazil